Sericophylla is a monotypic moth genus of the family Crambidae described by Alfred Jefferis Turner in 1937. Its only species, Sericophylla nivalis, described in the same paper, is found in Australia, where it has been recorded from Queensland.

References

Spilomelinae
Monotypic moth genera
Taxa named by Alfred Jefferis Turner
Moths of Australia
Crambidae genera